A History of Vodka is an academic monograph by William Pokhlyobkin, which was awarded the Langhe Ceretto Prize. Although the work had been finished in 1979, it was published just before the dissolution of the Soviet Union. In his book, in particular, Pokhlyobkin wanted the Russian vodka to be legally produced only from the rye stuff.

The book
After years of painstaking research Pokhlyobkin concluded that Russia's first grain-based vodka could have been distilled at the premises of the Chudov Monastery in the Moscow Kremlin by a monk called Isidore circa 1430. Apparently, the distillation technology spread to the city of Moscow itself in 1440s. Pokhlyobkin suggests that both prohibition and drunkenness are scourges which encourage one another. He suggests that irresponsible and uncultured ways of consuming vodka make people drunk, not vodka itself.

The later Russian editions include the 2005 softcover issue by Tsentrpoligraf.

Criticism
Three years after the publication the book was criticized by David Christian in Slavic Review. He cast doubt on statistics presented in the book. In Christian's opinion, the definitions of such terms as distilling and state monopoly were found so vague that it became hard to know when Pokhlyobkin offered firm dates for their first appearance. The arguments about the first usage of the word "vodka" and its first appearance were marked as convoluted, messy, repetitive as well as sometimes self-contradictory and unconvincing.  Christian also pointed out at anti-capitalist polemics and Stalinist snobberies of the book.

Another case, tackled by criticism, is the way On the Combinations of Water with Alcohol by Dmitriy Mendeleyev was emphasized. It was pointed out that Pokhlyobkin used Mendeleyev's data  in a speculative way to ascribe to solution of spirit and water the eminent "biochemical and physiological properties".

See also
Protected designation of origin

References

External links
English translation of the book

Russian non-fiction books
1991 non-fiction books
Economic history of Russia
Books about economic history